James Turner is a Canadian illustrator, comic book writer, and artist. He wrote the series Rex Libris for the Slave Labor Graphics (SLG) Publishing Company. The comic ran between 2005 and 2008, for a total of 13 issues. His most recent graphic novel, "Warlord of Io', is about a spoiled rich kid who inherits a planet.

Bibliography
Rex Libris, Slave Labor Graphics
Rex Libris Volume 1: I, Librarian, collects issues #1-5, Slave Labor Graphics, June 2007, 
Rex Libris Volume 2: Book of Monsters, collects issues #6-13, Slave Labor Grappooooopooopoopoohics, June 2009, 
Nil: A Land Beyond Belief, Slave Labor Graphics, April 2005, 
Warlord of Io, Slave Labor Graphics, July 2010,

Exhibitions
Artscape "For-Art's-Sake" Show, Juried Exhibition, 2002

Toronto Outdoor Art Show, Juried Exhibition, 2002
Tectonica Solo Show, Reactor Art and Design Gallery, Winter 2001

References

External links

 Reactor Art & Design represents James Turner as a commercial illustrator 
Slave Labor Graphics
Interview at ComiXology
Interview at ComicReaders

American speculative fiction artists
Canadian speculative fiction artists
American illustrators
American comics artists
American comics writers
Year of birth missing (living people)
Living people
Science fiction artists
Writers who illustrated their own writing